The O'Day 222 is an American trailerable sailboat that was designed by C. Raymond Hunt Associates as a cruiser and first built in 1984.

The O'Day 222 replaced the O'Day 22 in the company product line.

Production
The design was built by O'Day Corp., as part of Bangor Punta, in the United States. A total of 130 boats were built between 1984 and 1988, but it is now out of production.

Design
The O'Day 222 is a recreational keelboat, built predominantly of fiberglass, with wood trim. It has a fractional sloop rig, a raked stem, a plumb transom, a transom-hung rudder controlled by a tiller and a fixed stub keel with a retractable centerboard. It displaces  and carries  of ballast.

The boat is normally fitted with a small  outboard motor for docking and maneuvering.

The design has sleeping accommodation for four people, with a double "V"-berth in the bow cabin and two straight settee berths in the main cabin. The galley is located on the starboard side just aft of the bow cabin. The galley is equipped with a two-burner stove and a sink. A cooler maybe stowed under the companionway. The head is located under the bow cabin "V"-berth.

Operational history
In a 2010 review Steve Henkel wrote, "The 21- and 22-foot size range is a good length of boat for newish sailors starting out or those moving up from a beach boat or small daysailer. The O'Day 222 ... is a follow-on to the popular O'Day 22 ... The 222 has a deeper board-up draft, but also a deeper board-down draft, which improves upwind performance. Best features: The O'Day 222's size and modest sailplan and masthead rig make her relatively simple to sail. Worst features: Her Space Index is lowest of the comp group, as is her headroom. Beware, big and tall people. Her outboard is mounted on her transom, a long way from the helmsman’s control. The mainsheet, led aft to the transom, can become entangled with the outboard under certain conditions; some owners have installed a traveler in the forward end of the cockpit to eliminate this problem. The O'Day 222's rudder was made in a sandwich of two fiberglass skins with foam in between. Owners report their rudders are easily broken (e.g., carried away for the same reason as the O'Day 22's rudder). Chainplates also seem to be a weak point, and bear frequent inspection."

See also
List of sailing boat types

References

External links
Video - brief tour of an O'Day 222

Keelboats
1980s sailboat type designs
Sailing yachts
Trailer sailers
Sailboat type designs by C. Raymond Hunt Associates
Sailboat types built by O'Day Corp.